Phrixia is a genus of beetles in the family Buprestidae, containing the following species:

 Phrixia albomaculata Fisher, 1922
 Phrixia auricollis (Laporte & Gory, 1837)
 Phrixia cuprina Kerremans, 1909
 Phrixia filiformis Deyrolle, 1864
 Phrixia fossulata Kerremans, 1909
 Phrixia gratiosa Obenberger, 1940
 Phrixia luzonica Bellamy, 1991
 Phrixia opulenta Fisher, 1930
 Phrixia violacea Thery, 1926
 Phrixia vittaticollis Waterhouse, 1887

References

Buprestidae genera